The 2019 AfroBasket Women was held from 10 to 18 August 2019 in Dakar, Senegal. It was also the first step for the qualification for FIBA Africa for the women's basketball tournament at the 2020 Summer Olympics in Tokyo, Japan. The top six teams were qualified for the African pre-qualifying tournament.

Nigeria won their second consecutive and fourth overall title after beating Senegal in the final.

Qualification

Venue

Squads

Each team consisted of 12 players.

Preliminary round
The draw took place on 29 July 2019.

All times are local (UTC±0).

Group A

Group B

Group C

Group D

Knockout stage

Bracket

5th place bracket

Playoffs

Quarterfinals

5–8th place semifinals

Semifinals

Seventh place game

Fifth place game

Third place game

Final

Final standing

Statistics and awards

Statistical leaders

Points

Rebounds

Assists

Blocks

Steals

Awards
The all star-teams and MVP were announced on 18 August 2019.

References

External links
Official website

 
2019
2019 in African basketball
International women's basketball competitions hosted by Senegal
Women's Afrobasket
2019 in women's basketball